Lykourgos Logothetis (10 February 1772 – 25 May 1850 (O.S.)), born Georgios Paplomatas, was a Samian who became the island's leader during the Greek War of Independence.

The son of a wealthy merchant, Logothetis received a good education at Constantinople and then served as an official in the Phanariote administration of Wallachia. His political career experienced great vicissitudes: he served as an elder in his home island, taking the side of the progressive-radical Karmanioloi ("Carmagnoles", named after the French Revolutionary song Carmagnole) and the reactionary Kallikantzaroi ("goblins") who represented mostly the traditional land-holding elites. Under Logothetis, the Karmanioloi ruled Samos from 1807 until the intervention of the Ottoman authorities in 1812, which restored the Kallikantzaroi to power and forced the Karmanioloi to flee the island. During this time of exile he became a member of the Filiki Etaireia, and assumed the conspirational name by which became better known.

On the outbreak of the Greek War of Independence he returned to Samos and was quickly elected the island's political and military leader, founding the "Military-Political System of Samos", which he led until 1833, with the exception of the period 1828–30, when Samos was administered as part of the nascent Greek state. Logothetis was head of the Greek forces during the unsuccessful campaign to Chios in 1822, which led to the massacre and destruction of the island and was heavily criticized for his actions.

In 1833, through the intervention of the Great Powers, the island returned to Ottoman suzerainty as an autonomous principality, and Logothetis was forced to leave for the independent Kingdom of Greece. There he became involved in politics, and became a senator. He died of heart failure on 25 May 1850.

1772 births
1850 deaths
People from Samos
Eastern Orthodox Christians from Greece
Greek military leaders of the Greek War of Independence
Members of the Greek Senate
History of Samos